Friedrich Rohrer (14 May 1895 – 26 April 1945) was a Czech tennis player. He competed in the men's singles and doubles events at the 1924 Summer Olympics.

References

External links
 

1895 births
1945 deaths
Czech male tennis players
Olympic tennis players of Czechoslovakia
Tennis players at the 1924 Summer Olympics
Sportspeople from Brno